The Barony of Newton is a Scottish feudal barony located in the Parish of Bothkennar near Grangemouth, Stirlingshire. The Barony was erected on 3 April 1685 with Edward Wright as baron. The Barony was subsequently confirmed by Crown Charter issued under the Great Seal of George III, William Frederick, King of Great Britain and Ireland.

There are earlier references in the seventeenth century to Newton of Bothkennar as a place, for example John Callendar, was served heir to his father James Callendar  portioner of Newton in Bothkennar, 7 October 1637, while William Bruce of Newton, was served heir to his father Patrick Bruce of Newton within the barony of Bothkennar, 3 January 1655.  However it is not until 3 April 1685 that Newton is erected as a barony with Edward Wright, an advocate, as baron.

Edward Wright II
Edward Wright’s reign as baron of Newton was brief as within a few years his son Edward succeeded to the lands and title.  According to the Inquisitionum ad Capellam Regis Retornatarum Abbreviato on 30 May 1690 Edward Wright, was served heir to his father Edward Wright an advocate, in lands of Newton within the parish of Bothkennar and Lordship of Stirling, lands in the Grange of Bothkennar, the Mains of Bothkennar, fishing rights in the River Carron, the new mill and doocot  of Newton, united in the barony of Newton.  His father Edward Wright, an advocate, the first baron of Newton left a testament which was confirmed with Commissariot of Edinburgh on 2 May 1690 and may be consulted in the National Archives of Scotland in Edinburgh. Edward Wright, second baron of Newton, also had a brief reign as the records show that within a few years he was dead and that his brother John had inherited the barony.

John Wright
According to the Retours for Stirlingshire, number 321, John Wright, second son of the late Edward Wright advocate, was served heir to his brother Edward Wright eldest son of Edward Wright advocate, in the barony of Newton, on 16 December 1695.   John Wright extended his property in Stirlingshire when on 2 January 1702 he was granted the lands and barony of Kersey (Kerse). Kersey seems to have been transferred to his younger brother Richard sometime before 1710 as in that year he, Richard Wright of Kersey took action in the Court of Session, Scotland’s highest civil court, against the creditors of Bruce of Newton.  During the 1720s and 1730s there were several cases before Court of Session concerning Richard Wright of Kersey.

Richard Wright
Richard Wright of Kersey was served heir to his brother John Wright of Kersey, who died in March 1714, in half of Newton and Newton of Bothkennar and in the Grange and Mains of Bothkennar, also in the lands and barony of Kersey with salmon fishing in the River Forth, Stirlingshire, 2 February 1733.

Lawrence Dundas (1712–1781)

Thomas Dundas of Fingask, Perthshire, and his wife Bethia Baillie, daughter of John Baillie of Castlecary, Stirlingshire, had two sons namely Thomas Dundas of Fingask and Carron Hall, and Lawrence Dundas of Kerse. Lawrence, born in 1712, became Sir Lawrence Dundas baronet, a Member of Parliament for Linlithgow burghs from 1747 to 1748, a Privy Councillor in 1771, Vice Admiral of Shetland and Orkney, Commissary General and a contractor to the British Army from 1748 to 1759, was created a baronet 16 November 1762. Sir Laurence Dundas of Kerse received several grants during the 1760s and 1770s including Seabegs in 1764, parts of Kerse in 1766, Abbotskerse in 1772, West Kerse in 1773, also Clackmannan in 1763, and Denboig 1766. He also acquired the lands and barony of Newton around this period.  All these properties were in the Forth Valley an area which was rapidly industrialising.

Carron Iron Works

Some historians reckon the Industrial Revolution in Scotland began with the establishment of the Carron Iron Works in nearby Falkirk during 1759.   The most famous product of the contemporary Carron Iron Works was the carronade which was short, smooth bore, iron cannon developed for use by the Royal Navy.

Forth and Clyde Canal

Sir Lawrence was clearly an entrepreneur who saw opportunities and took them up, for example he is noted for having built the Forth and Clyde Canal, which linked east coast with the west coast, through his estates.  That canal was used mainly for the shipment of bulk commodities, especially coal from the Lanarkshire pits to Glasgow and Edinburgh.  Nearby lies a modern feature the Falkirk Wheel which links the Forth and Clyde Canal with the Union Canal.  Sir Lawrence Dundas founded Grangemouth in 1777 at the eastern end of the Forth and Clyde canal as a trans-shipment and service point.  Grangemouth today is probably Scotland’s busiest port.  The rapidly expanding town of Grangemouth gradually absorbed the parish of Bothkennar. 
In 1789, GEORGE III, William Frederick, King of Great Britain and Ireland as part of a greater earldom confirmed the barony and granted the original charter which now serves as documented reference for subsequent tracing of the title.

Thomas Dundas (1741–1820)

Sir Lawrence married Margaret Bruce, daughter of Brigadier General Alexander Bruce of Kennet, on 9 April 1738, and died 21 September 1781.  He was succeeded by his only son Thomas. Sir Thomas Dundas of Kerse, baronet, was born 16 February 1741, only son of Sir Laurence Dundas of Kerse, baronet, was granted various properties in the Forth Valley in the 1780s [for example see RGS.125.60]. He was appointed Lord Lieutenant and Vice Admiral of Orkney and Shetland, served as Member of Parliament for Richmond from 1763 to 1768, and for Stirling from 1768 to 1794, on 13 August 1794 he was created Baron Dundas of Aske. He married Charlotte Fitzwilliam, born 25 July 1745, second daughter of Earl Fitzwilliam, on 14 May 1764.  Sir Thomas is noted for having commissioned William Symington (1763-1831) to construct the Charlotte Dundas around 1803, as a tug for his canal, which was the world’s first steamboat.  He died on 14 June 1820 and was succeeded by his eldest son Lawrence.

Lawrence Dundas (1766–1839)

Lawrence Dundas, born 10 April 1766, he became Lord Lieutenant and Vice Admiral of Orkney and Shetland, Lord Mayor of York, and was created Earl of Zetland on 2 July 1838. The Honourable Laurence Dundas, eldest son of Thomas, Lord Dundas, was granted Kerse on 5 July 1806. [RGS.136.164/207]  He was the husband of Harriot, daughter of General John Hale. On his death on 19 February 1839 he was succeeded by his son Thomas as 2nd Earl of Zetland.

Thomas Dundas (1795–1873)

Thomas Dundas, was born on 5 February 1795, became 2nd Earl of Zetland, a   Knight of the Garter, Lord Lieutenant of the North Riding of Yorkshire, and Grand Master of the Freemasons of England.  Earl of Zetland sold lands at Seabegs to the Scottish Central Railway Company in 1848.  He married Sophia, daughter of Sir Hedworth Williamson Baronet.  The Earl died without issue on 6 May 1873 and the lands and titles went to his nephew.

Lawrence Dundas (1844–1929)

Lawrence Dundas was born on 16 August 1844, he was educated at Harrow and Cambridge, he became a Knight of the Thistle, a Knight of the Garter, an MP, Lord Lieutenant of Ireland, and an army officer.  In 1892 he was created Marquess of Zetland and Earl of Ronaldshay. He married Lillian, daughter of the Earl of Scarborough, and had two sons.  He died 11 March 1929 and was succeeded by his elder son Lawrence.

Lawrence John Lumley Dundas (1876–1961)

Lawrence John Lumley Dundas, 2nd Marquess of Zetland, was educated at Harrow and Cambridge, later he was an officer in the Territorial Army, a Member of Parliament, Governor of Bengal from 1917-1922, Secretary of State for India 1935-1940, president of a number of learned societies, Governor of the National Bank of Scotland, and a Privy Councillor.

Lawrence Aldred Mervyn Dundas (1908–1989)

Lawrence Aldred Mervyn Dundas, 3rd Marquess of Zetland, was born 12 November 1908 and educated at Harrow and Cambridge.  During World War II he served as a Major in the British Army, later he was a prominent Freemason, and Governor of Harrow School. He married Penelope, daughter of Colonel Ebenezer Pike on 2 December 1936.  He was succeeded by his son Lawrence Mark Dundas, 4th Marquess of Zetland.

Lawrence Mark Dundas

Philip David Pickering
The rights and title of the Barony of Newton were passed to Philip David Pickering in December 2011 [SBR 2012/1] as the 13th Baron of Newton. Born in the UK August 1948, raised in Canada, now a retired chief technology officer and systems engineer, he lives in Australia. 
In 1969, Philip married Fiona McTaggart, (b. Glasgow 1950) and had a daughter, Joanne Alexandra Pickering, by her (b. May 1973). They divorced in September 1980. Philip later married Patricia Anne Campbell in Calgary Alberta, before immigrating to Australia in 1982. They are without issue. His daughter Joanne, now married; of Victoria, British Columbia is heir apparent.

Barons of Newton

References

External links
 Burkes Peerage Website
 National Archives of Scotland

Feudalism in Scotland
Newton
Newton
Stirlingshire